() is a coastal long distance footpath in the Isle of Man. Because it is a closed loop around the coast, it can be walked in either a clockwise or an anti-clockwise direction.

Route and history
The  starts and finishes at the Millennium Bridge over Douglas Harbour.

The walk was created to mark the Island's "Heritage Year" celebrations in 1986 and generally follows the coast, passing through terrain varying from shingle beaches at the Ayres to over  hills and cliffs.

The route comprises the following sections:

Douglas to Castletown, including the Langness peninsula  
Castletown to Port St Mary, 
Port St Mary to Port Erin, 
Port Erin to Peel,  (this section can be shortened by leaving out Bradda Head and the Niarbyl)
Peel to Kirk Michael, 
Kirk Michael to Jurby, 
Jurby to Point of Ayre, 
Point of Ayre to Ramsey, 
Ramsey to Maughold, 
Maughold to Laxey, 
Laxey to Douglas, 

The Fastest Known Time (FKT) for the Raad ny Foillan is 21 hours, 21 minutes and 25 seconds, set by Orran Smith(self-supported) in October 2020.

Flora and fauna
The coastal sections may provide sightings of seabirds such as kittiwakes, Manx shearwaters, puffins, guillemots and sea gulls together with grey seals, and at points inland the rare Manx Loaghtan sheep on areas protected by Manx National Heritage.

See also
The Millennium Way - a  walk between Castletown and Ramsey.
The Bayr ny Skeddan - a  walk between Castletown and Peel based on the route once used by Manx fishermen.
The IOM Heritage Trail - a  walk along disused Isle of Man Railway lines from Douglas to Peel.

References

External links 
 IOM.co.uk
 Manx government website
 VisitIsleOfMan website
 Manx Footpath Conservation Group

Footpaths of the Isle of Man